The Border Town (Chinese name: 边城) is a Chinese movie adapted from the novel of the same name written by Shen Congwen with Dai Na, Feng Hanyuan playing the leading role. It
tells a story about a border town which has little connection with outside world in the early Republic of China. This movie has received an Honor Award in the 9th Canada Montreal international film festival and the Golden Rooster Award for Best Director.

Plot
Cuicui is raised by her 70-year-old grandfather. 17 years ago, Her mother was pregnant before marriage and she committed suicide after giving birth to Cuicui by drinking cold water in the river. When Cuicui grows up, her grandfather begins to worry about her marriage, because he doesn't want Cuicui to have a miserable life like her mother. There is a rich man in the border town, who has two handsome sons that both fell in love with Cuicui. Cuicui likes the younger son while her grandfather misunderstands her feelings and thinks the older son is more suitable for Cuicui. Unfortunately, the older son dies in an accident and the rich man pins the blame on Cuicui's grandfather. Even though the younger son loves Cuicui, he can't marry her after the death of his dear brother. Finally, he chooses to leave the town. Cuicui's grandfather dies on a cold, rainy night, leaving Cuicui alone in the world. However, grief doesn't break her down. She takes over her grandfather's work, waiting for the younger son to come back.

References 
https://web.archive.org/web/20120426054830/http://www.dy.com.cn/modules/FilmInfo.aspx?FilmID=17748
https://web.archive.org/web/20120425062955/http://book.qq.com/a/20090929/000003.htm

External links 
http://www.m1905.com/vod/85691.shtml?t=1#flv

Chinese drama films
1984 films